Sandra Wächtershäuser (born 4 March 1975) is a German former professional tennis player.

A left-handed player from Schöneck, Wächtershäuser played on the professional tour in the 1990s and reached a best singles ranking of 181. She featured in the qualifying draw for the 1995 US Open and made the second round of the 1995 German Open, by beating world number 41 Elena Likhovtseva.

ITF finals

Doubles: 2 (1–1)

References

External links
 
 

1975 births
Living people
German female tennis players
Tennis people from Hesse